Redbird, Redbirds, Red Bird or Red Birds may refer to:

Bird
 Redbird, another name for the northern cardinal
 Redbird, another name for the summer tanager
 Red bird of paradise, a near threatened species

Mythological
 An East Asian variant of the phoenix
 Vermilion Bird or Red Bird

People
 Red Bird (c. 1788–1828), Ho-Chunk chief
 Redbird Smith (1850–1918), Cherokee traditionalist
 Zitkála-ša (Red Bird, Gertrude Bonnin) (1876–1938), Yankton Dakota author
 Red Bird (baseball) (1890–1972), American baseball player
 Che-se-quah (Red Bird, Joan Hill) (1930–2020), Muscogee Creek-Cherokee artist

Place in the United States
 Redbird, Kentucky
 Redbird, Missouri
 Redbird, Nebraska
 Redbird, Oklahoma
 Redbird, New York
 Redbird, Dallas, a neighborhood in the Oak Cliff area of Dallas, Texas
 Redbird, West Virginia
 Red Bird River, a tributary of the Kentucky River

Music
 Redbird (band), an American Americana/folk trio
 Redbird (John Zorn album), 1995
 Redbird (Heather Nova album), 2005
 Redbird (Redbird album), 2005
 Red Bird Records, a record label founded by Jerry Leiber and Mike Stoller
 Redbird Records, an independent record label founded by Ludo

Popular culture
 Redbird (comics), the name of Robin's car from Batman comics, and one of the aliases of Damian Wayne
 Red Bird (web series), an American television Western web series
 Redbird, the mascot of De Pere High School in De Pere, Wisconsin
 Redbird, slang for a $5 casino chip
 Red Bird (character), the main character in Angry Birds
 The Red Bird (Astrid Lindgren book), book by Astrid Lindgren

Sports
 The Redbirds, nickname of the St. Louis Cardinals, a Major League Baseball team
 Memphis Redbirds, the Memphis class AAA minor league baseball team
 Louisville Redbirds, the former name of the Louisville Bats minor league baseball team
 Hamilton Redbirds, a defunct minor league baseball team that played from 1988 to 1992
 Glens Falls Redbirds, a defunct minor league baseball team that played in 1993
 Union Springs Redbirds, a defunct minor league baseball team that played from 1936 to 1938 in Alabama
 Columbus Red Birds, a defunct minor league baseball team that played from 1931 to 1954 in Ohio
 Columbus Red Birds (Georgia), a defunct minor league baseball team that played from 1909 to 1959 in Georgia, best known as the Columbus Foxes
 Raleigh Red Birds, a name used by some defunct minor league baseball teams in Raleigh, North Carolina
 Williamson Red Birds, a defunct minor league baseball team that played from 1939 to 1942
 Huntsville Red Birds, a defunct minor league baseball team that played in 1935 in Arkansas
 Geneva Red Birds, a defunct minor league baseball team that played in 1946 and 1950 in Alabama
 Illinois State Redbirds, athletic teams from Illinois State University

Other uses
 Redbird Flight Simulations, an American flight simulator manufacturer
 Redbird trains, the New York City Subway cars that were painted a deep red paint scheme.

See also

 
 
 Bird (disambiguation)
 Red (disambiguation)
 Phoenix (disambiguation)
 Firebird (disambiguation)